Shane Pow (born 4 October 1990) is a Singaporean actor and was named as one of the 8 Dukes of Caldecott Hill.

Education and early life
Pow has an elder sister. He was educated at Woodlands Ring Secondary School and Ngee Ann Polytechnic. Pow is an avid sportsman and has represented the Singapore National Youth Basketball team in international competitions before an unexpected injury forced him to stop competing competitively.

Media career

Early career 
When Pow was 19, he was a part-time presenter for SPH RazorTV’s sports segment “Livewire”. He was talent scouted by a modelling agency, he began doing photography shoots such as the “Get Your Sexy Back” Campaign to encourage responsible drinking. In 2011, Shane signed up for  Manhunt Singapore 2011 contest. He was managed by Beam Artistes, which also had organised Manhunt Singapore 2011. After ManHunt, Shane secured cameo roles in numerous local dramas.

Mediacorp artiste 
In 2012, Pow signed a contract with MediaCorp as an artiste after he had completed his National Service obligations. His breakthrough role came in 2012 as B Niu (B牛) in the local drama It Takes Two. He was also nominated for the Best Newcomer in the Star Awards 2013. He slowly rose to fame and obtained more significant roles in dramas such as Love At Risk and The Recruit diaries.

In 2014, Pow ventured into hosting, where he hosted Cheap and Good and also Style Check-in 4. He has also filmed Serve H.O.T, Against the Tide and Three Wishes that has awarded for Top 10 Most Popular Male Artistes in Star Awards 2015, 2016 & 2017. In 2015, he has filmed Family On The Edge and The Journey: Our Homeland. In 2016, he has filmed House of Fortune, Beyond Words & Peace & Prosperity and two toggle original series, I Want to Be a Star where his first leading role & Soul Reaper. 

In September 2016, Pow, appeared on television in blackface after a casting director fails to find a person of African descent for a role in the drama series I Want to Be a Star. Pow's father in the series, played by veteran actor Chew Chor Meng, had said Indians and Africans are "all the same". In the following month, the episode was pulled from Mediacorp's online streaming service Toggle following a public outcry on social media for being racist.

In 2017, he had filmed When Duty Calls that gains his nomination for Best Supporting Actor in Star Awards 2018. On 12 December 2017, Pow signed on a management contract with Mediacorp, thus ending his working relationship with Beam Artistes. In 2018, he has filmed Mind Matters and Toggle original series, Die Die Also Must Serve and Love At Cavenagh Bridge.  

Pow was among a few celebrities who had breached the safe distancing measures adopted during the COVID-19 pandemic in Singapore in an incident that took place on 2 October 2020 while celebrating fellow artiste, Jeffrey Xu's birthday. At the time of the celebration, group gatherings exceeded the maximum number of five participants. He was subsequently fined $300 and disciplined.

2021: Contract termination with Mediacorp 
Pow was linked to two drink driving incidents. He was convicted of drink driving on 30 July 2014. On 17 September 2020, Pow was allegedly caught drink driving with 49 micrograms of alcohol per 100ml of breath, surpassing the legal limit of 35mcg. Pow was charged on 22 April 2021 with one count of driving under the influence of alcohol.

On 26 April 2021, Mediacorp announced the termination of their contract with Pow after his second drink driving incident and breach of COVID-19 safe distancing measures. Pow would complete his pending work with Mediacorp's The Celebrity Agency until 4 May 2021. At the time of termination, Pow had roles in two upcoming dramas, Soul Old Yet So Young and The Heartland Hero. While his role in Soul Old Yet So Young was not affected due to the drama being in post-production stages, he was replaced by James Seah midway through the 130-episode The Heartland Hero as the drama is still being filmed. Pow would appear in the first 30 episodes, while Seah would be in the rest of the drama.

A day after the termination of his contract, Pow apologised for his actions. Actor Mark Lee also offered Pow a place in his company. Pow pleaded guilty on 14 July 2021 and was sentenced to five weeks in jail, fined $6,000 and banned from driving for five years.

Before the sentencing, Pow was seen in a livestream by Mdada, a livestream sales company headed by Addy Lee, Pornsak Prajakwit and Michelle Chia. The livestream had beauty products sold and demonstrated. After Pow's release from jail, Pow joined Li Nanxing's management agency.

Business career 
In 2017, Pow opened an eatery, Mojo, with his friend, who operates a cafe, Sin Lee Foods, at Telok Ayer. In 2020, Pow sold his shares in Mojo and open a Korean style hawker stall, Gogiyo, with three friends in Toa Payoh.

Filmography

Film

Television

Compilation album

Awards and nominations

References

External links
 
 Shane Pow profile on The Celebrity Agency (archived)

Living people
1990 births
Singaporean male television actors
Ngee Ann Polytechnic alumni
Singaporean people of Chinese descent